Nacer contigo is a Venezuela telenovela created by José Simón Escalona for Televen, based on the play La Celestina of Fernando de Rojas. It premiered on 22 February 2012 and ended on 17 July 2012.

The series stars Emma Rabbe as Alina, Guillermo Pérez as Pleberio, Nacarid Escalona as Celeste Rojas, Jerónimo Gil as Caín Bermúdez, Josette Vidal as Melibea Fuentes and Lasso as Calixto Sánchez.

Cast

Primary 
 Emma Rabbe as Alina 
 Guillermo Pérez as Pleberio 
 Nacarid Escalona as Celeste Rojas
 Jerónimo Gil as Caín Bermúdez
 Josette Vidal as Melibea Fuentes
 Lasso as Calixto Sánchez

Secondary 
 Verónica Ortíz as Florencia
 Catherina Cardozo as Belinda
 Mayra Africano as Mercedes Mata
 Gonzalo Velutini - Fernando Gael
 Emmanuel Palomares as Miguel Ángel
 Sandra Díaz as Areúsa Rodríguez
 Eben Renán as Centurio Ortíz
 Ángel Casallas as Pármeno Mata
 José Medina as Anselmo
 Oriana Colmenares as Lucrecia
 Samantha González as Elicia 
 Ángel David Díaz as Sempronio 
 Marco Pérez as Seba
 Ángel Cueva as Jordi
 Diego Sánchez as Pedro Pan
 Gabriel Mantilla as Gabo

References 

2012 telenovelas
2012 Venezuelan television series debuts
2012 Venezuelan television series endings
Televen telenovelas
Venezuelan telenovelas
Spanish-language telenovelas
Television shows based on books
Television shows set in Caracas